The 2019–20 season was Manchester City's 118th season of competitive football, 91st season in the top flight of English football and 23rd season in the Premier League. In addition to the league, the club competed in the FA Cup, as holders of both competitions. They also entered the UEFA Champions League, hoping to win the team's first European trophy since 1970. At the start of the season, City defeated Liverpool to win their second consecutive and sixth overall Community Shield. The Citizens also successfully retained the EFL Cup, making it their third consecutive League Cup win and their fifth in seven seasons.

The season covered the period from 1 July 2019 to 31 August 2020, having been extended from 30 June 2020 for an indefinite period following the suspension of all elite sport in the UK in March 2020 as part of the response to the COVID-19 pandemic. The domestic season resumed on 17 June, and concluded on 26 July, while the Champions League resumed on 7 August.

This was the first season since 2007–08 without former captain Vincent Kompany, who departed to Anderlecht.

Kits
Supplier: Puma / Sponsor: Etihad Airways

Season review
Manchester City began the season as unprecedented holders of all four domestic competitions. Their first successful defence came on 4 August, as they defeated Liverpool on penalties at Wembley in the 2019 FA Community Shield, in the traditional curtain raiser to the season.

Acknowledging that City would be judged by their Champions League performance after all, Pep Guardiola said that the new season's main objective would be to win the European title. The Cityzens progressed to the knock-out phase and faced old foes Real Madrid there. City won the away game 2–1, but the remainder of the tournament was indefinitely postponed due to the COVID–19 pandemic. Finally, UEFA announced that the tournament would be resumed in August 2020. After 8 domestic trophies were clinched with Guardiola, fans eagerly await the team's first European title since 1970. The home match against Madrid was scheduled for 7 August. Thanks to a brace from Raheem Sterling and Gabriel Jesus, the Citizens once again defeated Madrid 2–1, achieving a 4–2 victory on aggregate and advancing to the quarter-finals. However, Man City once again exited the competition at the next stage, losing 1–3 to Lyon on 15 August in a one-off game held at the neutral Estádio José Alvalade in Lisbon.

In the Premier League however, City were unable to maintain their consistency from the previous 2 seasons. Key players Aymeric Laporte and Leroy Sané endured extended injury layoffs from the beginning of the season until early 2020. Laporte's absence in particular impacted on the teams' defensive capabilities and their effectiveness against opposition set up to quickly counterattack on the break. City already had dropped more league points by the end of December 2019 (19) than they had in their entire previous two seasons.

For the second year in a row, City were the first top European team to reach 100 goals scored in all competitions when they beat Fulham 4–0 in an FA Cup fourth round match on 26 January 2020.

On 14 February 2020, UEFA stated its intention to ban Manchester City from the all UEFA club competitions for the 2020–21 and 2021–22 seasons for alleged breaches of the UEFA Financial Fair Play Regulations. UEFA noted the club's right to appeal at the Court of Arbitration for Sport (CAS) and the club submitted an appeal on 26 February 2020. As part of the appeal registration the Court of Arbitration for Sport stated a date for a final decision would be in the first half of July 2020. The appeal was heard on 8 June 2020. The appeal was upheld on 13 July 2020, and the ban was overturned.

On 1 March 2020, City won their third EFL Cup in a row and their fourth in five seasons, defeating Aston Villa 2–1 at Wembley Stadium in the final.

In March, the season became affected by the COVID-19 pandemic. On 10 March, the match between Manchester City and Arsenal, due to be played the next day, was postponed after a number of Arsenal players made close contact with Olympiacos owner Evangelos Marinakis, who had tested positive for infection with the coronavirus, when the two teams had met in the Europa League 13 days earlier. On 12 March, it was revealed that three Leicester City players were self-isolating. Manchester City also announced that their defender Benjamin Mendy was also self-isolating, after a family member displayed symptoms of the virus. Later in the evening, it was then confirmed that Arsenal head coach Mikel Arteta had tested positive for coronavirus. On 13 March, following an emergency meeting between the Premier League, The Football Association (FA), the English Football League and the FA Women's Super League, it was unanimously decided to suspend professional football in England until at least 4 April 2020. On 19 March, the suspension was extended to at least 30 April 2020. At the same time the FA agreed to extend the season indefinitely, past the scheduled end date of 1 June.

In late May 2020 the UK Government began to ease the lockdown measures which had been taken to combat the COVID-19 contagion and it was duly announced on 28 May that the Premier League clubs had agreed to play the remaining 92 Premier League fixtures and FA Cup fixtures in empty stadiums and with modified rules to minimize contagion from 17 June 2020. City restarted the season with a postponed game in hand against Arsenal on 17 June, winning 3–0. On 25 June City lost 2–1 away to Chelsea and as a result, Liverpool were confirmed as 2019–20 Premier League champions with seven rounds of games to be played. A week later, on 2 July, City were able to assuage some of the disappointment of losing the Premier League title to their rivals when they beat Liverpool 4–0 in a home league match, also avenging November's controversial 1–3 loss.

In beating Newcastle United 5–0 on 8 July, City achieved a pass completion rate of 93.7% - the highest accuracy on record in the Premier League since 2003–04 (since detailed passing statistics first were measured). Riyad Mahrez reaching 10 Premier League goals in the season in the same game also ensured City would be the first English top-flight side to have five different players score at least 10 league goals in a single season since Everton in 1984–85 (Sterling, De Bruyne, Agüero, Jesus, Mahrez). The 5–0 victory away against Brighton & Hove Albion on 11 July then confirmed that City would finish the season as runners-up to Liverpool in the league. City scored 102 league goals in 2019–20; it was the fifth time they reached a century of goals after 1936–37, 1957–58, 2013–14 and 2017–18, an English record.

In the restarted FA Cup, City defeated Newcastle 2–0 away from home on 28 June, advancing to the semi-finals where they faced Arsenal at Wembley. However, inform Aubameyang scored a brace and lukewarm City were shut out, being denied an opportunity to defend their title in a showcase final. The Gunners went on to win a record 14th FA Cup title in the final, defeating Chelsea.

The end of the 2019–20 season marked the end of David Silva's ten-year stint with the club. Silva's final appearance in the Champions League quarter-final defeat to Lyon was his 436th for City; in doing so he entered the top 10 all-time appearance makers for the club, as well as becoming the first modern era player to reach this level in 34 years. Silva also ended his career at City as the club's most decorated player at the time, with fourteen league and cup winner medals. Due to COVID-19 precautions, Silva's final appearances had to be played behind closed doors. City hoped there would be an opportunity in the following season for fans to return in order to give Silva a proper sendoff.

Kevin De Bruyne was recognised in the end of season awards for his performances at City, being named the Premier League Player of the Season and PFA Players' Player of the Year, despite Liverpool winning the Premier League title that year. De Bruyne had already won the club's own Player of the Season Award for the third time in five years, and the Premier League's Playmaker of the Season award for providing a league-leading 20 assists, equalling the record of most assists in a Premier League season by Thierry Henry in 2002–03.

Pre-season and friendlies

Manchester City played a number of pre-season matches in 2019, including the 2019 Premier League Asia Trophy in China.

Competitions

Overview

Transfers and loans

Transfers in

Transfers out

Loans in

Loans out

Overall transfer activity

Expenditure

Total:  £133,790,000

Income

Total:  £64,600,000

Net totals

Total:  £77,979,000

Statistics

Squad statistics

Appearances (Apps) numbers are for appearances in competitive games only, including sub appearances.
Red card numbers denote: numbers in parentheses represent red cards overturned for wrongful dismissal.

Goalscorers
Includes all competitive matches. The list is sorted alphabetically by surname when total goals are equal.

Hat-tricks

(H) – Home ; (A) – Away

Clean sheets
The list is sorted by shirt number when total clean sheets are equal. Numbers in parentheses represent games where both goalkeepers participated and both kept a clean sheet; the number in parentheses is awarded to the goalkeeper who was substituted on, whilst a full clean sheet is awarded to the goalkeeper who was on the field at the start of play.

Awards

Etihad Player of the Month

Premier League Player of the Month

Agüero's win in January 2020 was at the time his seventh overall, the most in the competition's history.

Premier League Goal of the Month

PFA Players' Player of the Year

Premier League Player of the Season

UEFA Men's Midfielder of the Season

PFA Team of the Year

Etihad Player of the Season

City's player of the season as voted for by the clubs' fans.

UEFA Team of the Year

UEFA Champions League Squad of the Season

Premier League Golden Glove

Premier League Playmaker of the Season

De Bruyne's total of 20 assists for the season also equalled the Premier League record set by Thierry Henry in 2002–03.

Notes

References

External links

2019–20
Manchester City
Manchester City